Idle Hours is an oil on canvas landscape painting by the American Impressionist painter William Merritt Chase. Completed in 1894, it measures  90.2 by 64.8 centimeters, and is now housed at the Amon Carter Museum of American Art, Fort Worth. It is one of many paintings by Chase that depicted his wife and children at ease.

Description
Idle Hours portrays Chase's wife, sister, and two daughters on the shore at eastern Long Island, where Chase taught a summer school in landscape painting. The artwork incorporates urban subtexts and country retreats in response to urbanization and industrialization.

References

Paintings by William Merritt Chase
Paintings in Fort Worth, Texas
1894 paintings
Water in art